Oksana Aleksandrovna Chusovitina (born 19 June 1975) is an eight-time Olympic gymnast who has competed for the Soviet Union, Uzbekistan, and Germany.

Chusovitina's career as an elite gymnast has spanned more than three decades. She won the USSR Junior Nationals in 1988 and began competing at the international level in 1989 before many of her current rivals were even born. She is the only gymnast ever to compete in eight Olympic Games, and is one of only two female gymnasts to compete at the Olympics under three different national teams: the Unified Team in 1992; Uzbekistan in 1996, 2000, 2004, 2016 and 2020; and Germany in 2008 and 2012. She is one of the 18 Olympians and 6 female Olympians to participate in 8 different Olympics. 

Chusovitina has also competed in 16 World Championships, four Asian Games, and three Goodwill Games. Chusovitina holds the record for the most individual world championship medals in a single event (nine, on the vault). Chusovitina is one of the few female gymnasts to return to international competitions after becoming a mother.

Soviet Union
Chusovitina began gymnastics in 1982. In 1988, at the age of 13, she won the all-around title at the USSR National Championships in the junior division.

By 1990, Chusovitina was a vital member of the Soviet team, and was sent to compete in various international meets. She was the vault gold medalist at the 1990 Goodwill Games and nearly swept the 1990 World Sports Fair in Japan, winning the all-around and every event except the uneven bars. The following year she won the floor exercise at the 1991 World Artistic Gymnastics Championships and placed second on the vault. In 1992 Chusovitina competed at the Olympics with the Unified Team, shared in the team gold medal and placed seventh in the floor final. She also won her second World Championships vault medal, a bronze.

Uzbekistan
After the 1992 Olympics, when the former Soviet gymnasts returned to their home republics, Chusovitina began competing for Uzbekistan and continued training with Uzbekistan head coach Svetlana Kuznetsova, also her personal coach. Conditions at the national training facility in Tashkent were a far cry from the Soviet Round Lake training center, and Chusovitina was forced to practice on antiquated, and in some cases, unsafe equipment. In spite of this setback, she was able to consistently produce world-class routines.

Chusovitina represented Uzbekistan from 1993 to 2006 and competed for them at the 1996, 2000 and 2004 Olympics, the 1994, 1998 and 2002 Asian Games and the 1994 and 2001 Goodwill Games. During this era she was the strongest gymnast on the Uzbekistan national team, earning more than 70 medals in international competitions and qualifying to the Olympics three times.

For her contributions to gymnastics, Chusovitina was granted the title of "Honored Athlete of the Republic of Uzbekistan" by the Uzbekistan Ministry of Cultural and Sports Affairs. In 2001, she was named as the first WAG representative to the International Gymnastics Federation (FIG)'s Athletes' Commission. In addition, Chusovitina graduated from the Sports University in Tashkent.

In late 1997 Chusovitina married Uzbek Olympic wrestler Bakhodir Kurbanov, whom she first met at the 1994 Asian Games in Hiroshima. The couple's son, Alisher, was born in November 1999.

Germany
In 2002, Alisher was diagnosed with acute lymphocytic leukemia (ALL).  Seeking advanced medical treatment for their son, Chusovitina and her husband accepted an offer of help from Shanna and Peter Brüggemann, head coaches of the Toyota Cologne club, and moved to Germany. With prize money earned from gymnastics competitions, along with the help of the Brüggemanns and members of the international gymnastics community who fundraised and donated to the cause, Chusovitina was able to secure treatment for Alisher at the University of Cologne's hospital.
 While Alisher underwent treatment in Cologne, Chusovitina trained with the German team.

Uzbekistan released Chusovitina to compete for Germany in 2003. However, due to rules requiring three years of residency, she was unable to gain German citizenship immediately. From 2003 to 2006 she trained in Germany but continued to compete for Uzbekistan, representing her native country at the 2003 and 2005 World Championships and the 2004 Olympics. In 2003, 12 years after her world championships debut, Chusovitina won the gold medal on the vault at that year's world championships in Anaheim.

In 2006, Chusovitina obtained German citizenship. Her first competition for Germany was the 2006 World Championships, where she won a bronze medal on the vault and placed ninth in the all-around.

In July 2007, she won the all-around title at the 2007 German National Championships. At her first European Championships, she placed second on the vault. At the 2007 World Championships in Stuttgart, Chusovitina helped the German squad to a 10th-place finish in the preliminary round, which qualified them to send a full team to the 2008 Olympics in Beijing, where she was the oldest female competitor in  her discipline. She qualified for the vault event final where she finished in 2nd place, thus earning the first individual Olympic medal of her career.
Chusovitina competed on three events at the 2008 Women's European Championships in Clermont-Ferrand, France, helping the German team to a seventh-place finish in the team finals. In the vault event final, she defeated reigning European champion Carlotta Giovannini to win the gold medal.

At the 2008 Olympics, the German team placed 12th in the qualifying round of competition. Chusovitina qualified to the individual all-around final, where she placed ninth overall. She also qualified in fourth place for the vault final. In the vault final, she won the silver medal with a score of 15.575.

Despite earlier claims that she would attempt to compete in the London 2012 Summer Olympics, Chusovitina announced in April 2009 that she intended to only participate in the 2009 World Gymnastics Championships in October, and that she would not continue. The championships, she stated, are "enough."

However, she returned to compete in some competitions in 2010 (including the 2010 Houston National Invitational).  She won the silver medal on vault at the 2011 European Championships, the 2011 World Championships and the 2012 European Championships.

Chusovitina competed at the 2012 Summer Olympics for Germany. The games were a remarkable sixth Olympics for Chusovitina, who qualified for the vault final where she placed in fifth behind her German teammate, Janine Berger. Afterward Oksana declared she would retire as a gymnast and concentrate on coaching.

However, instead of retiring, Oksana switched back to competing for Uzbekistan. She competed at the 2016 and 2020 Olympics. She has stated her goal is to win an Olympic medal on vault for Uzbekistan, because she’s already won medals for the Unified Team and Germany, but not for her home country.

Recent years
Despite her statements in 2012, Chusovitina ultimately returned the following year and announced plans to continue competing through the Rio 2016 Summer Olympics. She went on to qualify an individual place for Uzbekistan at a qualifying event in Rio de Janeiro in April 2016. By competing, she set a record as the oldest gymnast to ever compete at the Olympic Games at the age of 41 and 2 months and the only gymnast ever to compete in seven consecutive Olympiads, surpassing the record of six that she set in 2012 with Yordan Yovchev of Bulgaria. Following those Olympics, Chusovitina announced that she would continue her career with the intention of competing in the 2020 Olympics in Tokyo  
 
After competing solely on vault for several years, Chusovitina announced in 2018 that she would begin competing all-around again.

Chusovitina competed at the 2019 World Artistic Gymnastics Championships in order to qualify for Tokyo. She had a rough turn in qualifications, falling on her second vault and on balance beam, but despite these errors, she ended up ranked just high enough in the all-around standings to secure one of the last all-around berths to the Olympics from that event. She was selected as a flag bearer for Uzbekistan at the 2020 Summer Olympics opening ceremony, but was then replaced just few hours before the ceremony. Her final day of competition on 25 July 2021 in Tokyo saw her fail to qualify for the finals in Vault. 

Despite stating that she would retire following the delayed 2020 Olympic Games, she later stated that she would return to training for the 2022 Asian Games, which ended up being postponed indefinitely due to the pandemic.  She then won a gold medal on vault at Doha World Cup Event in 2022, and won the vault again at the 2022 Uzbekistan National Championships.  When asked how the postponement of the Asian games would influence her training plans, she stated that her goal now is to continue training and compete in the 2024 Olympic Games in Paris, France.  This would be her 9th Summer Olympic Games.  Chusovitina competed at the postponed Islamic Solidarity Games in 2022 alongside Dildora Aripova and Ominakhon Khalilova.  They finished second as a team behind Turkey. Individually Chusovitina won gold on vault.

Eponymous skills
Chusovitina has five eponymous skills in the Code of Points.

Competitive history

Chusovitina also won the 1994 Goodwill Games Mixed Pairs Silver Medal with Yevgeny Shabayev, Aleksei Voropayev and Elena Grosheva.

Year-end world rankings

Vault 
2010: #9
2011: #1
2013: #1
2015: #1

Beam 
2010: #28
2013: #24
2015: #45

Floor 
2015: #7

See also
 List of top medalists at the World Artistic Gymnastics Championships
 List of Olympic female artistic gymnasts for Uzbekistan
 List of Olympic female artistic gymnasts for Germany
 List of female artistic gymnasts with the most appearances at Olympic Games
 List of athletes with the most appearances at Olympic Games

References

External links

 
 List of competitive results
 Chusovitina (Floor Exercise skills)

1975 births
Living people
Uzbekistani female artistic gymnasts
Soviet female artistic gymnasts
German female artistic gymnasts
Olympic gymnasts of the Unified Team
Olympic gymnasts of Uzbekistan
Olympic gymnasts of Germany
Gymnasts at the 1992 Summer Olympics
Gymnasts at the 1996 Summer Olympics
Gymnasts at the 2000 Summer Olympics
Gymnasts at the 2004 Summer Olympics
Gymnasts at the 2008 Summer Olympics
Gymnasts at the 2012 Summer Olympics
Gymnasts at the 2016 Summer Olympics
Olympic gold medalists for the Unified Team
Olympic silver medalists for Germany
World champion gymnasts
Medalists at the World Artistic Gymnastics Championships
Originators of elements in artistic gymnastics
German people of Russian descent
Uzbekistani people of Russian descent
People from Bukhara
Olympic medalists in gymnastics
Medalists at the 2008 Summer Olympics
Honoured Masters of Sport of the USSR
Asian Games medalists in gymnastics
Gymnasts at the 1994 Asian Games
Gymnasts at the 1998 Asian Games
Gymnasts at the 2002 Asian Games
Gymnasts at the 2014 Asian Games
Gymnasts at the 2018 Asian Games
Medalists at the 1992 Summer Olympics
Asian Games gold medalists for Uzbekistan
Asian Games silver medalists for Uzbekistan
Asian Games bronze medalists for Uzbekistan
Medalists at the 1994 Asian Games
Medalists at the 2002 Asian Games
Medalists at the 2014 Asian Games
Medalists at the 2018 Asian Games
Competitors at the 1990 Goodwill Games
European champions in gymnastics
Islamic Solidarity Games competitors for Uzbekistan
Gymnasts at the 2020 Summer Olympics